Milija Žižić (born 28 February 1979) is a Serbian football manager and former player.

Playing career
During his playing career, Žižić played for Mogren and Javor Ivanjica in the First League of FR Yugoslavia. He also played professionally in Hong Kong and Azerbaijan.

Managerial career
On 29 November 2021, Žižić was appointed as manager of Serbian SuperLiga club Metalac Gornji Milanovac.

References

External links
 

1979 births
Living people
Footballers from Sarajevo
Serbs of Bosnia and Herzegovina
Serbia and Montenegro footballers
Serbian footballers
Association football defenders
FK Mogren players
FK Javor Ivanjica players
FK ČSK Čelarevo players
Kitchee SC players
Gabala FC players
RFK Grafičar Beograd players
First League of Serbia and Montenegro players
Serbian First League players
Hong Kong First Division League players
Azerbaijan Premier League players
Serbian expatriate footballers
Expatriate footballers in Hong Kong
Expatriate footballers in Azerbaijan
Serbian expatriate sportspeople in Hong Kong
Serbian expatriate sportspeople in Azerbaijan
Serbian football managers
FK Bežanija managers
FK Metalac Gornji Milanovac managers
Serbian SuperLiga managers